is an onsen (hot spring resort) located in the Iizaka district (former town of Iizaka) within the city of Fukushima, Japan. It is located to the northwest of the city center, and is connected to Fukushima Station by the Fukushima Kōtsū Iizaka Line railroad.

Description
Iizaka traditional hot spring town features over 40 traditional ryokan, and 9 public baths, including one of Japan’s oldest community bathhouses,  Sabakoyu (鯖湖湯 or "Mackerel Lake Baths"). Sabakoyu was originally spelled 佐波来湯 when, according to legend,  Yamato Takeru, prince of the Yamato dynasty and son of semi-legendary 12th Emperor Keikō, visited the area and was cured of his sickness after bathing in the hot springs.  Matsuo Bashō, the famous Edo period poet, visited Sabakoyu in 1689.

References

External links

Fukushima sightseeing development incorporated company

Hot springs of Fukushima Prefecture
Tourist attractions in Fukushima Prefecture
Spa towns in Japan
Fukushima (city)